Kristi Harrower (born 4 March 1975) is an Australian professional basketball player, who three times (2000, 2004 and 2008) won the silver medal with the Australian Women's Team at the Summer Olympics, and also the bronze in 2012. She played in the Women's National Basketball Association (WNBA) from 1998 to 2005 for the Phoenix Mercury and Minnesota Lynx.

Personal
Harrower was born on 4 March 1975, and calls Bendigo her hometown.

In 2009, her grandmother died. She was featured in the WNBL's 2009 league calendar. Harrower had an injury in 2012 to her Achilles and could not run on it for a while.

Basketball
Harrower is a guard. She plays point guard. She is an Australian Institute of Sport alumni and the programme considers her one of their success stories.

As a competitor at the 1994 Australian Under-20 national championships, Harrower won the Bob Staunton Award. In 1992 and 1993, she had a scholarship with the Australian Institute of Sport. In 2008, she was featured as a basketball star on myFiba.

Professional basketball
Harrower has played professional basketball for over twenty years. In 2006, she played for Valenciennes in France.

WNBA
She entered the WNBA as an undrafted player. Her first team she played with was the Phoenix Mercury, whom she signed with before the start of the 1998 season. In her two seasons with the team, she played in 62 games. She joined the Minnesota Lynx in 2000 along with Mercury players Marlies Askamp and Angela Aycock as part of a trade that saw Tonya Edwards and Trisha Fallon go from Minnesota to Phoenix. She played for the Lynx in 2003, where she averaged 2.8 points and 2.3 assists per game. She ended her Lynx career in 2005 having played 96 games while averaging of 3.8 ppg, 2.4 apg and 1.8 rpg.

In 2009, Harrower was playing for the Los Angeles Sparks in the WNBA. She missed three games that season in order to attend her grandmother's funeral in Australia.

WNBL
Harrower played for Bendigo in 2008/2009 and was with the team again for the 2009/2010 season where she was the WNBL's MVP. She resigned with the Spirit in October 2009. She played for the Bendigo Spirit in the 2010/2011 season, wearing number 19. She had a three-point shooting percentage of 23%. She was played injured most of the season, with problems in her shoulder and knee. She averaged 13.8 points a game, 5.5 rebounds a game and 5.2 assists a game. She was the team's general manager that year. Her team started off with a record of 1–4. In a November 2010 game against the Adelaide Lightning, she scored 14 points and 8 assists in a 91–79 win for the Spirit. She played for the Bendigo Spirit in 2011/2012. Her father, Bernie Harrower, was the team's coach. In January 2012, she made a clutch shot for her team that helped them beat Canberra. Harrower led the Bendigo Spirit to league titles in 2013 and 2014. For the 2014–2014 season, Harrower became an assistant coach for the Bendigo Spirit, but also returned as a player after injuries to guard Kelly Wilson prevented her from playing in the first part of the season.

On 7 January 2015 Harrower announced her retirement from the WNBL, also stating that she was 16 weeks pregnant. Her 18-year WNBL career began in 1994. After 10 years in the league, she was gone for 7 years (2001-2007) but returned in 2008 and continued until retirement. Harrower was league MVP once (2009-2010 season) and selected 7 times for the WNBL All-Star Five.  She played on championship teams in 1994 with the Adelaide Lightning, and 2012-2013 and 2013–2014 with the Bendigo Spirit. In 2013, she was the WNBL Defensive Player of the Year.

National team
Harrower is a member of the Australia women's national basketball team and has been described as the national team's pocket dynamo. She was a member of the 1998 Australian Senior Women's Team that won a bronze medal at the World Championships in Germany. She was a member of the 1999 Australian senior women's team.

She was a member of the 2000 Summer Olympics team that won a silver medal. Going into the Olympics, her team was ranked third in the world. In 2002, she was a member of the Australian Senior Women's Team that won a silver medal in the World Championships in Spain. She was a member of the Australian senior team that won a silver medal at the 2004 Summer Olympics. She played in eight games at the 2004 Games, where she averaged 8 points, 3.8 rebounds and 2.8 assists per game.

Harrower was a member of the 2005 Opals. In 2006, she was a member of the Australian women's senior team that won a gold medal at the World Championships in Brazil. In March 2007, she was named to the national team what would prepare for the 2008 Summer Olympics. In 2008, she did not participate in the Good Luck Beijing 2008 held in China in the lead up to the Olympics because of a commitment to her European club. She was a member of the 2008 Summer Olympics Australian women's team that won a silver medal at the Olympics.

In June 2010, Harrower was viewed by national team coach Carrie Graf as one of a quartet of strong players that would represent Australia in a tour of China, the United States and Europe in the next few months. In July 2010, she participated in a four-day training camp and one game test match against the United States in Connecticut. In 2010, she participated in the Salamanca Invitational Basketball Tournament in Spain. Her team beat Spain 85–64. They also beat the United States. She missed the game against Spain because she injured her ankle. In 2010, she was a member of the senior women's national team that competed at the World Championships in the Czech Republic. She missed a three-game test series against China in Queensland in July 2011 because of an injury. In July 2011, she participated in the Olympic qualification competition. She was returning to the team following an injury.

Harrower was named to the 2012 Australia women's national basketball team. In February 2012, she was named to a short list of 24 eligible players to represent Australia at the Olympics. She was scheduled to participate in the national team training camp held from 14 to 18 May 2012 at the Australian Institute of Sport. She made the 2012 Olympic Squad cut down to 14 players, and won the bronze medal.

WNBA career statistics

Regular season

|-
| align="left" | 1998
| align="left" | Phoenix
| 30 || 0 || 11.8 || .365 || .344 || .750 || 0.7 || 1.7 || 0.5 || 0.1 || 1.0 || 2.3
|-
| align="left" | 1999
| align="left" | Phoenix
| 32 || 3 || 20.8 || .364 || .279 || .808 || 2.0 || 3.0 || 0.8 || 0.1 || 1.4 || 4.5
|-
| align="left" | 2001
| align="left" | Minnesota
| 4 || 1 || 18.0 || .467 || .500 || 1.000 || 1.0 || 2.8 || 0.8 || 0.0 || 0.8 || 5.3
|-
| align="left" | 2002
| align="left" | Minnesota
| 27 || 6 || 17.8 || .389 || .333 || .400 || 1.7 || 2.0 || 0.4 || 0.0 || 1.0 || 3.6
|-
| align="left" | 2003
| align="left" | Minnesota
| 31 || 0 || 16.1 || .368 || .372 || .615 || 1.3 || 2.3 || 0.6 || 0.1 || 1.3 || 2.8
|-
| align="left" | 2005
| align="left" | Minnesota
| 34 || 34 || 24.5 || .351 || .324 || .778 || 2.4 || 2.8 || 1.1 || 0.0 || 1.6 || 4.6
|-
| align="left" | 2009
| align="left" | Los Angeles
| 31 || 26 || 16.8 || .360 || .205 || .818 || 1.8 || 2.2 || 0.5 || 0.0 || 0.9 || 3.1
|-
| align="left" | Career
| align="left" | 7 years, 3 teams
| 189 || 70 || 18.1 || .367 || .316 || .760 || 1.7 || 2.4 || 0.7 || 0.1 || 1.2 || 3.6

Playoffs

|-
| align="left" | 1998
| align="left" | Phoenix
| 6 || 0 || 13.0 || .600 || .429 || .000 || 1.0 || 1.2 || 0.8 || 0.2 || 0.7 || 4.5
|-
| align="left" | 2003
| align="left" | Minnesota
| 3 || 0 || 21.7 || .364 || .286 || .500 || 2.3 || 1.7 || 0.3 || 0.0 || 1.0 || 3.7
|-
| align="left" | 2009
| align="left" | Los Angeles
| 5 || 2 || 11.8 || .500 || .333 || .000 || 0.2 || 2.2 || 0.4 || 0.0 || 0.8 || 2.6
|-
| align="left" | Career
| align="left" | 3 years, 3 teams
| 14 || 2 || 14.4 || .512 || .353 || .500 || 1.0 || 1.6 || 0.6 || 0.1 || 0.8 || 3.6

See also

 List of Australian WNBA players
 WNBL Defensive Player of the Year Award

References

External links
Official website

1975 births
Living people
Adelaide Lightning players
Australian expatriate basketball people in the United States
Australian Institute of Sport basketball (WNBL) players
Australian women's basketball players
Basketball players at the 2000 Summer Olympics
Basketball players at the 2004 Summer Olympics
Basketball players at the 2008 Summer Olympics
Basketball players at the 2012 Summer Olympics
Bendigo Spirit players
Los Angeles Sparks players
Medalists at the 2000 Summer Olympics
Medalists at the 2004 Summer Olympics
Medalists at the 2008 Summer Olympics
Medalists at the 2012 Summer Olympics
Minnesota Lynx players
Olympic basketball players of Australia
Olympic bronze medalists for Australia
Olympic medalists in basketball
Olympic silver medalists for Australia
Sportspeople from Bendigo
Phoenix Mercury players
Point guards
Undrafted Women's National Basketball Association players
Sportswomen from Victoria (Australia)
Australian expatriate basketball people in France
Australian expatriate basketball people in Germany
Australian expatriate basketball people in Russia